Bagrus orientalis is a species of fish in the family Bagridae. It is found in Malawi and Tanzania. Its natural habitat is freshwater lakes.

References

Bagrus
Fish of Africa
Fish described in 1902
Taxonomy articles created by Polbot